Anne (English title: Mother) is a Turkish drama television series based on the Japanese drama Mother, starring Cansu Dere, Vahide Perçin, and Beren Gökyıldız. It aired on Star TV from October 25, 2016, to June 20, 2017.

Synopsis 
Zeynep Güneş gets a job as a temporary teacher at a local elementary school in city of Bandırma. She soon realizes one of her students, Melek, is suffering from child abuse from her mother, Şule, and mother's boyfriend, Cengiz. When Zeynep realizes that nobody is doing anything to help Melek, she takes matters into her own hands by faking Melek's death, kidnapping her, taking her to Istanbul and attempting to become her new mother. However, when Şule and Cengiz find out Melek is actually alive and kidnap her back, Şule decides to try and force Melek to love her back. And when Şule and Cengiz have a new baby, Hassan, Melek is forced to take care of him as well as herself. Despite this, Zeynep refuses to give up until she has Melek back with her. Eventually, Şule and Zeynep realize they have to work together to fix all this. The story revolves around Melek's life, Zeynep's identity, and the irreplaceable bond between a mother and daughter.

Cast 
 Cansu Dere as Zeynep Güneş
 Vahide Perçin as Gönül Aslan / Sakar Teyze
 Beren Gökyıldız as Melek Akçay / Turna Güneş
 Gonca Vuslateri as Şule Akçay
 Berkay Ateş as Cengiz Yıldız
 Gülenay Kalkan as Cahide Güneş
 Can Nergis as Ali Arhan
 Serhat Teoman as Sinan Demir
 Şükrü Türen as Arif
 Alize Gördüm as Gamze Güneş
 Ahsen Eroğlu as Duru Güneş
 Umut Yiğit Vanlı as Sarp
 Onur Dikmen as Rıfat
 Erdi Bolat as Ramo
 Ali Süreyya as Mert
 Meral Çetinkaya as Mrs. Zeynep Aslan
 Zuhal Gencer Erkaya as Saniye
 Arzu Oruç as Dilara
 Ayşegül İşsever as Serap

Awards and nominations

References

External links 
  
 

2016 Turkish television series debuts
2017 Turkish television series endings
Turkish drama television series
Star TV (Turkey) original programming
Television series by Med Yapım
Television series by MF Yapım
Turkish television series based on Japanese television series